New Baltimore is an unincorporated community in Bethel Township, Posey County, in the U.S. state of Indiana.

History
New Baltimore was laid out in 1837 and was once an important shipping point for river traffic. With the advent of other modes of transportation, business activity shifted to other nearby places, and the town's population dwindled.

Geography

References

Unincorporated communities in Posey County, Indiana
Unincorporated communities in Indiana